This list of castles in Picardy is a list of medieval castles or château forts in the region in northern France.

Links in italics are links to articles in the French Wikipedia.

Aisne

Oise

Somme

See also
 List of castles in France
 List of châteaux in France

References

 Picardy
Buildings and structures in Hauts-de-France